Martin Handford (born 27 September 1956) is a British children's author and illustrator from London who gained worldwide fame in the mid-1980s with his Where's Wally? creation (known as Where's Waldo? in North America).

Early life
Born in London, Handford was a solitary child, born to divorced parents. He began drawing crowds when he was 4 or 5 years old, and later as a child, making stick figures on paper. After school, when most other children he knew would go out and play games, he would draw pictures instead. His inspiration to draw such figures came from classic films and the toy soldiers he played with during that era.

As an adult, Handford worked for three years in an insurance office (Crusader Insurance Company) to pay for his studies at UCA (University for the Creative Arts) formerly KIAD (Kent Institute of Art and Design) in Maidstone, Kent. After graduating, Martin worked as a freelance illustrator specialising in drawing crowd scenes for numerous clients.

Career
Martin Handford created the album cover for The Vapors' 1981 album Magnets. The cover features an assassination scene which forms the shape of an eye.

In 1986, Handford was asked by his art director at Walker Books to draw a character with peculiar features so that his pictures of crowds had a focal point. After much thinking, he came up with the idea of "Wally", a world traveller and time travel aficionado who always dresses in red and white. Wally is joined on most of his travels by his friend, Wenda, who wears clothes with the same colours as Wally's, and by an evil character named Odlaw (Waldo spelled backwards) who dresses in yellow and black.

Handford became a minor celebrity with the success of Where's Wally?. The Where's Wally? trademark sold in 28 different countries. Beginning in 1987, Handford produced a total of seven "classic" Where's Wally? books, but his character was branched out into other products, such as notebooks, pillows, posters, video games and many others. There was even a syndicated comic strip as well as two animated TV series (one in 1991 and another in 2019).

Handford has gained the reputation of being a methodical and diligent worker: sometimes it would take him up to eight weeks to draw one two-page sketch "Wally" and the characters surrounding him. The drawings are drawn to the same scale as in the books and each 2-page spread usually contains about 300 to 500 figures, with Wally often being the last character drawn into the crowd.

The Where's Wally? books were published in the UK by Walker Books and in the United States under the title Where's Waldo? first by Little, Brown and Company before being taken on by Candlewick Press (Walker Books' American subsidiary publishing company). The first four titles were originally printed in Italy, but later reprinted in China.

A film based on the Where's Wally? series of books was planned for filming in 2005 by Nickelodeon Movies but was cancelled due to a management change at Paramount Pictures.

In 2007, Handford sold the rights to Where's Wally? to the Entertainment Rights Group, the world's biggest independent owner of children's brands. He is said to have made £2.5 million in this sale.

The style of art executed by Handford is probably the most famous example of "Wimmelbilderbuch" drawings, originally popularised by Hieronymus Bosch, Pieter Brueghel the Elder and Hans Jürgen Press.

References

1956 births
Living people
English illustrators
Writers from London
Artists from London
Alumni of the University for the Creative Arts